The Young Will Live is a 1965 Greek drama film directed by Nikos Tzimas. It was entered into the 4th Moscow International Film Festival.

Cast
 Phaedon Georgitsis as Giorgos
 Alexandra Ladikou as Efi
 Sylvia Hatzigeorgiou
 Notis Peryalis
 Foivos Taxiarhis

References

External links
 

1965 films
1965 drama films
Greek drama films
1960s Greek-language films